The 2004 FIA GT Valencia 500 km was the second round the 2004 FIA GT Championship season.  It took place at the Circuit de Valencia, Spain, on April 18, 2004.

Official results
Class winners in bold.  Cars failing to complete 70% of winner's distance marked as Not Classified (NC).

Statistics
 Pole position – #5 Vitaphone Racing Team – 1:31.368
 Fastest lap – #5 Vitaphone Racing Team – 1:32.241
 Race winner average speed – 148.670 km/h

References

 
  
 

Valencia
500km Valencia
Valencia 500